JMO may refer to:
 Jennifer Morrison (Born 1979), American actress
 Jomsom Airport, in Nepal
 Jupiter Magnetospheric Orbiter
 Yugoslav Muslim Organization
 Journal des marches et opérations, a French expression for a War diary
USAJMO, an American high school mathematics competition related to the USAMO
Junior Mathematical Olympiad, a math competition organized by the UKMT charity